Joseph Rodger Roa (born October 11, 1971), nicknamed "The Roa Constrictor", is former Major League Baseball right-handed pitcher. Roa is a graduate of Hazel Park High School in Hazel Park, Michigan, and was drafted by the Atlanta Braves in the 18th round of the 1989 amateur draft. Roa was frequently called "The Roa Constrictor" by Twin Cities radio personality Dark Star.

Minor league career
As a journeyman pitcher, Roa played in twelve Major League organizations during his career. In the minors, Roa played for the Atlanta Braves (-), New York Mets (-), Cleveland Indians (1994-), San Francisco Giants (-), Florida Marlins, Philadelphia Phillies, Milwaukee Brewers, and Pittsburgh Pirates.

From 1989 to 1995, Roa amassed a 67-35 record within the Braves, Mets, and Indians organizations. Roa continued to pitch well in the minors, garnering a 122-67 career record with a 3.49 ERA. His final minor league season came in 2005 with the Indianapolis Indians, an affiliate of the Pittsburgh Pirates. Roa appeared in 256 minor league games in his career.

Major league career
In 1995, Joe Roa went 17-3 for the Cleveland Indians Triple-A affiliate, the Buffalo Bisons. His performance earned him a September call-up against the Chicago White Sox in 1995. Roa appeared in 28 games for the San Francisco Giants in 1997 after only appearing in two games since being drafted. Roa appeared in 120 major league games during his career. He was released by the Pittsburgh Pirates during spring training on February 14, .

Personal life
Roa lives in the Detroit area with his wife Allison, and three children: sons Zack and Drake, and daughter Mackenzie. Roa was inducted into the Buffalo Baseball Hall of Fame in August 2018.

References

External links

 ESPN article profiling Joe Roa

Cleveland Indians players
San Francisco Giants players
Philadelphia Phillies players
Colorado Rockies players
San Diego Padres players
Minnesota Twins players
Major League Baseball pitchers
1971 births
Living people
Baseball players from Michigan
Gulf Coast Braves players
Norfolk Tides players
Buffalo Bisons (minor league) players
Fresno Grizzlies players
Akron Aeros players
Indianapolis Indians players
Sportspeople from Southfield, Michigan
Binghamton Mets players
Calgary Cannons players
American expatriate baseball players in Canada
Macon Braves players
Phoenix Firebirds players
Portland Sea Dogs players
Pulaski Braves players
Scranton/Wilkes-Barre Red Barons players
St. Lucie Mets players